A blend is  a mixture of two or more different things or substances; e.g., a  product of a mixer or blender.

Blend
Blend may also refer to:

 Blend word, a word formed from parts of other words
 Blend (album), a 1996 album by BoDeans
 Blend (cigarette), a Swedish brand
 Blend (textile), Textile product made out of a mixture of two or more fibers
 .blend (file format), a file format used by the open-source 3D application Blender
 Consonant blend, a group of consonants which have no intervening vowel
 Polymer blend, a member of a class of materials analogous to metal alloys
 Microsoft Blend for Visual Studio (formerly Microsoft Expression Blend), a user interface design tool for WPF and Silverlight
 Blend modes in digital image editing, used to determine how two layers are blended into each other
 The Blend (Sirius XM), a satellite radio channel
 Mashup (music)

Blended
Blended may refer to:
 Blended (film), a 2014 film starring Adam Sandler and Drew Barrymore
 Blended threat, a software exploit involving a combination of attacks against different vulnerabilities
 Blended whiskey, the product of blending different types of whiskeys and often also neutral and near-neutral spirits, coloring, and flavorings
 Blended malt whisky, a blend of different single malt whiskies from different distilleries
 Blended tea, a combination of different kinds of teas to guarantee consistent quality

See also
 Blender (disambiguation)
 Blending (disambiguation)
 Blende (disambiguation)
 Meld (disambiguation)